This is a list of episodes for the program Being Erica. The series debuted on CBC Television on January 5, 2009, and on SOAPnet on February 19, 2009.  With the exception of the second season, the series has an ISAN root ID of 125801 (0001-EB69).

Overview

Season 1
The show moved from Mondays at 9 p.m. to Wednesdays at 9 p.m. effective February 11, 2009. In the United States, SOAPnet aired on Thursdays at 10 p.m., on February 19, 2009.

Season 2
Starting on June 23, the first season was completely rerun on Tuesdays at 9pm. Upon the second season's premiere, this timeslot was kept. In the USA, SOAPnet moves the show from Thursdays at 10pm to Wednesdays at 10pm, on January 20, 2010.  This season incorrectly used ISAN root IDs for every episode from 140672 (0002–2580) to 141940 (0002-2A74), then later corrected the data entries.

Season 3
The show moved from Tuesdays at 9 p.m. to Wednesdays at 9 p.m. effective October 20, 2010. In the USA, SOAPnet moved the show on Wednesdays from 10 p.m. to 11 p.m., effective January 26, 2011.

Webisodes
Five webisodes in a series entitled "The Road Less Travelled" can be found on the Season Three Disc 3 DVD on its North American release.

Season 4

Ratings

The Dutch ratings are all according to the SKO (stichting kijk onderzoek) which can be compared to the Nielsen ratings in the US.

Season 1

Season 2

Season 3

Season 4

References

Lists of Canadian television series episodes
Lists of comedy-drama television series episodes

fr:Saison 2 des Vies rêvées d'Erica Strange